The Miss Guatemala 2009 pageant was held on May 25, 2009 at Auditorio Nacionalin the capital city Guatemala City, Guatemala. This year only 24 candidates were competing for the national crown. The chosen winner will represent Guatemala at the Miss Universe 2009 and at Miss Continente Americano 2009. The winner of best national costume, the costume will be use in Miss Universe 2009. Miss World Guatemala will represent Guatemala at the Miss World 2009. Miss Guatemala Internacional will represent Guatemala at the Miss International 2009. The First Runner-Up will enter Miss Intercontinental 2009 and the Second Runner-Up will enter Top Model of the World 2009. The Top 10 Semifinalists entered Reina Internacional del Café 2009, Reina Hispanoamericana 2009, Reina Mundial del Banano 2009, Miss Globe International 2009, and Miss Tourism International 2009.

Final Results

Special Awards
 Miss Photogenic – Lourdes Figueroa  (Ciudad Capital)
 Miss Congeniality (voted by the candidates) – Jessica Arévalo  (Progreso)
 Best National Costume – Lourdes Figueroa  (Ciudad Capital)

Official Delegates

External links
Official Website

Miss Guatemala
2009 beauty pageants